This is a list of presidential trips made by Donald Trump during 2017, the first year of his presidency as the 45th president of the United States.

This list excludes trips made within Washington, D.C., the U.S. federal capital in which the White House, the official residence and principal workplace of the president, is located. Also excluded are trips to Camp David, the country residence of the president. International trips are included. 
Here are the number of visits per state or territory he traveled to:
One: Alabama, Arizona, Connecticut, Delaware, Georgia, Indiana, Iowa, Kentucky, Louisiana, Michigan, Mississippi, North Carolina, North Dakota, Puerto Rico, Tennessee and Utah
Two: Hawaii, Missouri, Nevada, Ohio, South Carolina, West Virginia and Wisconsin
Three: Pennsylvania and Texas
Five: Maryland
Six: New York
Ten: New Jersey
Twelve: Florida
Thirty-two: Virginia

January

February

March

April

May

June

July

August

September

October

November

December

See also
 List of international presidential trips made by Donald Trump
 List of post–2016 election Donald Trump rallies
 List of presidential trips made by Donald Trump

References

2017 in American politics
2017 in international relations
2017-related lists
Lists of events in the United States
Trips, domestic